Mohammed Fairouz (born November 1, 1985) is an American composer.

He is one of the most frequently performed composers of his generation and has been described by Daniel J. Wakin of The New York Times as an "important new artistic voice".

Fairouz began composing at an early age and studied at the New England Conservatory of Music and the Curtis Institute of Music. His teachers included Gunther Schuller, Halim El-Dabh, and John Heiss.

Fairouz lives in New York City.

Vocal music 
Fairouz says that he first set the poem "The True Knowledge" by Oscar Wilde to music at the age of 7 and has gone on to write hundreds of art songs and over a dozen song cycles.  In Poets & Writers Magazine, he described himself as being obsessed with text.

Three Fragments of Ibn Khafājah was commissioned by the Cygnus Ensemble and sets poetry by Arab Andalucian poet Ibn Khafaja.

Musicians for Harmony commissioned the song cycle Furia for baritone Randall Scarlata together with the Imani Winds and the Borromeo String Quartet and sets Western texts about the Middle East.

Jeder Mensch, was written for Kate Lindsey with texts set from the diaries of Alma Mahler. Lindsey is also the soloist in a 2014 recording of Fairouz's 2012 cycle, Audenesque (in memory of W. B. Yeats), with the LPR Ensemble conducted by Evan Rogister, released in 2015 on the Deutsche Grammophon label (catalog no. B0022417). The disc also features Fairouz's 2013 instrumental work, Sadat.

Fairouz has also collaborated extensively with living poets. Bonsai Journal, on texts by Judson Evans, was released on Albany Records.

Fairouz's theatrical song cycle, written with Wayne Koestenbaum, titled Pierrot was commissioned by the Da Capo Chamber Players.

The Pierrot ensemble, Lunatics at Large commissioned the cycle Unwritten on texts by David Shapiro.

Fairouz has also written an oratorio entitled Zabur, which was premiered by the Indianapolis Symphonic Choir and the Indianapolis Symphony Orchestra in April 2015.  Staying true to his focus on text, the work sets a libretto by Najla Said and features text in both Arabic and English. Zabur is scored for a full orchestra, mixed choir, children's mixed choir, tenor soloist, and baritone soloist.

Operas 
Sumeida's Song is Fairouz's first opera and is based on the play Song of Death by the Egyptian playwright Tawfiq al-Hakim The opera follows the return of the protagonist Alwan to his Upper Egyptian peasant village, and his attempts to bring modernity to darkness in an effort to break a never ending cycle of violence. The opera also clearly depicts the grave consequences of this pioneering energy. The opera is recorded on Bridge Records.

In May 2015, MSNBC's Morning Joe announced that Mohammed Fairouz would be teaming up with best-selling American author David Ignatius to create a political opera called 'The New Prince' based on the teachings of Niccolò Machiavelli. The opera was commissioned by the Dutch National Opera Speaking with The Washington Post, Ignatius described the broad themes of the opera in terms of three chapters: "The first chapter is about revolution and disorder. Revolutions, like children, are lovable when young, and they become much less lovable as they age. The second lesson Machiavelli tells us is about sexual obsession, among leaders. And then the final chapter is basically is the story of Dick Cheney [and] bin Laden, the way in which those two ideas of what we’re obliged to do as leaders converged in such a destructive way."

Fairouz is also currently at work on a new opera about the lives and deaths of Zulfikar Ali Bhutto and Benazir Bhutto. The opera features Nathan Gunn and Kate Lindsey in the lead roles and the libretto is being written in collaboration with the prominent Pakistani author Mohammed Hanif.

Orchestral music

Symphonies 
Fairouz has written four symphonies. His Third Symphony, Poems and Prayers was commissioned by Northeastern University's Middle East Center for Peace, Culture, and Development and is cast for solo voices, mixed chorus and orchestra. The Symphony sets the texts of Arab poets such as Fadwa Tuqan and Mahmoud Darwish, the Israeli poet Yehuda Amichai, as well as prayers such as the Aramaic Kaddish.  The Third Symphony was premiered on February 16, 2012 by conductor Yoon Jae Lee, mezzo-soprano Rachel Calloway, Baritone David Kravitz, Ensemble 212 and The Young New Yorkers Chorus at the Miller Theater at Columbia University.

Fairouz's Fourth Symphony In the Shadow of No Towers is scored for wind ensemble and is inspired by Art Spiegelman's graphic novel of the same title. The symphony explores American life in the aftermath of 9/11. It was described by The New York Times as "technically impressive, consistently imaginative and in its finest stretches deeply moving". The symphony has been recorded on Naxos Records by the University of Kansas Wind Ensemble, under the direction of Dr. Paul Popiel.

The final movement of Fairouz's First Symphony Homage to a Belly Dancer is based on an essay by Edward Said about the Egyptian belly dancer Tahia Carioca.

Concertos 

Fairouz's Cello Concerto was written for Israel-born cellist Maya Beiser for the Detroit Symphony Orchestra. It was premiered by the Orchestra under the direction of Leonard Slatkin.

Fairouz has written a violin concerto called Al-Andalus for Rachel Barton Pine and the Alabama Symphony Orchestra. The concerto was praised at its premiere for containing "some of the most melancholy and nostalgic writing heard yet among ASO's new music projects".

Fairouz's Double Concerto for Violin, Cello and orchestra States of Fantasy was commissioned by New York-based orchestra Ensemble 212. It is inspired by Jacqueline Rose's book of the same title and was written for violinist Nicholas Kitchen and cellist Yeesun Kim of the Borromeo String Quartet.

Fairouz has also written a clarinet concerto, Tahrir, for David Krakauer. The work takes its title from Tahrir Square in Cairo, Egypt. This piece was commissioned by a group of alumni of NYC's Wagner Junior High School in memory of teacher Herb Greenhut. Krakauer is also a Wagner alum.

Akhnaten, Dweller in Truth, a dance scene for cello and orchestra, takes its name from Naguib Mahfouz's book of the same title.

Chamber and solo music 
Fairouz's Wind Quintet, Jebel Lebnan, written for the Imani Winds, musically chronicles events from the Lebanese Civil War. The Imani Winds recorded the work for Naxos Records.

His Lamentation and Satire for string quartet was recorded by the Borromeo String Quartet for release on GM/Living Archive Recordings.

His string quartet, The Named Angels, was also written for the Borromeo String Quartet. The work, about the mythology of angels in Middle Eastern Folklore, has been recorded by the Del Sol Quartet on the Sono Luminus record label.

Fairouz has written a sonata for unaccompanied violin (2011) called Native Informant for Rachel Barton Pine. Native Informant is the title work of a Naxos Records album of Fairouz's chamber music.

Recordings 
 2008 – Boston Diary (Albany Records TROY1176)
 2010 – As It Was, Is, and Will Be (GM Recordings GM 2080) by Borromeo String Quartet
 2011 – Critical Models (Dorian Sono Luminus DSL 92146)
 2012 – Sumeida's Song (Bridge Records Bridge 9385)
 2013 – Native Informant (Naxos Records Naxos 8.559744)
 2013 – In the Shadow of No Towers (Naxos Records Naxos 8.573205)
 2014 – Poems and Prayers (Dorian Sono Luminus DSL 92177)
 2015 – Follow, Poet (Deutsche Grammophon B0022417)
 2015 – Scrapyard Exotica (Sono Luminus DSL-92193) by Del Sol String Quartet

References

External links 
 Official Website
 Mohammed Fairouz at Peermusic Classical

Media 
 Mohammed Fairouz in Strings Magazine, May, 2012
 Mohammed Fairouz on New Music Box, February 22, 2012
 Mohammed Fairouz on NPR's All Things Considered, February 18, 2012
 Mohammed Fairouz on PRI's The World, January 25, 2012
 Mohammed Fairouz on WQXR/Q2, January 13, 2012
 Mohammed Fairouz's "Critical Models" is WQXR/Q2 Album of the Week, December 6, 2011
 Mohammed Fairouz's contribution to The New York Times' The Score, July 6, 2011

1985 births
21st-century American composers
21st-century American male musicians
21st-century classical composers
African-American male classical composers
American male classical composers
African-American classical composers
American classical composers
African-American opera composers
American people of Arab descent
American people of Egyptian descent
Curtis Institute of Music alumni
LGBT classical composers
Living people
Male opera composers
New England Conservatory alumni
String quartet composers
21st-century African-American musicians
20th-century African-American people